"Tell Me I Was Dreaming" is a song co-written and recorded by American country music artist Travis Tritt.  It was released in April 1995 as the fourth and final single from his album Ten Feet Tall and Bulletproof.  It peaked at number 2 in the United States, and number 3 in Canada.  The song was written by Tritt and Bruce Ray Brown.

Critical reception
Deborah Evans Price, of Billboard magazine reviewed the song favorably, saying that the "big ballad combines an impassioned vocal performance with Gregg Brown's nifty production touches." She goes on to call the song "country through and through."

Music video
The song's major success was largely driven by the controversial and heartbreaking music video, which was directed by Michael Merriman, and premiered in early 1995. It was filmed in Austin, Texas, and is the second video in Travis Tritt's trilogy of videos that tell the story of Mac Singleton, a disabled U.S. Army veteran; the first video being the chart-topping "Anymore" (1991), and the third one being the Top 30 "If I Lost You" (1998). In this video, his pregnant wife Annie is killed while cleaning a boat, subsequently slipping, falling and hitting her head on the docks. A very panicked Mac and his friend, Al, try to rescue her, but unfortunately, she dies at a hospital, although the baby girl that she was carrying survives. Mac names the baby after Annie. The video uses the nearly 5 minute single version (4:53).

Chart positions
"Tell Me I Was Dreaming" debuted at number 73 on the U.S. Billboard Hot Country Singles & Tracks for the week of April 15, 1995.

Year-end charts

References

1995 singles
1994 songs
Travis Tritt songs
Songs written by Travis Tritt
Warner Records singles